Sander de Graaf (born 13 June 1995) is a Dutch rower. He won a gold medal at the 2020 European Championships and competed at the 2020 Summer Olympics, both in the men's coxless four events.

Career
De Graaf joined a rowing club during his first year at Eindhoven University of Technology in 2013.

He competed in the 2017 World U23 Championships, partnering with Jochem Kostelijk to finish seventh in the coxless pair event. In 2018, he paired with Vincent Klaassens at the World Championships, the World Rowing Cup and the European Championships. They also took a bronze medal at the Dutch national championships.

De Graaf transitioned to the coxless four event thereafter. He teamed with Freek Robbers, Jan van der Bij and Nelson Ritsema in the final stage of the 2019 World Rowing Cup in Rotterdam, where they placed seventh. In early 2020, national team head coach Mark Emke switched out veteran Vincent van der Want in favor of de Graaf on the Dutch boat. The new crew composed of de Graaf, van der Bij, Ritsema and Boudewijn Röell won the gold medal at the 2020 European Championships in Poznań. They were unable to repeat as European champions in 2021, however, finishing in fourth place. De Graaf competed with the crew the delayed 2020 Summer Olympics in Tokyo, which they had qualified for due to their performance at the 2019 World Championships prior to his inclusion. At the Tokyo Games he helped the crew reach the final via repechage, where they ultimately placed sixth.

References

External links

Living people
1995 births
Dutch male rowers
Olympic rowers of the Netherlands
Rowers at the 2020 Summer Olympics
People from Drimmelen
Eindhoven University of Technology alumni
Sportspeople from North Brabant
20th-century Dutch people
21st-century Dutch people
World Rowing Championships medalists for the Netherlands